AIIS may refer to:

Al-Ameen Institute of Information Sciences
Albanian Institute for International Studies
American Institute of Indian Studies
Anterior inferior iliac spine
Automated Import Information System